Virgil Victor Jacomini (May 30, 1899 – October 4, 1984) was an American rower who competed in the 1920 Summer Olympics.

In 1920, he was part of the American boat from the United States Naval Academy (USNA), which won the gold medal in the men's eight. He graduated from USNA in 1921.

References

External links
 
 
 

1899 births
1984 deaths
Rowers at the 1920 Summer Olympics
Olympic gold medalists for the United States in rowing
American male rowers
Medalists at the 1920 Summer Olympics